Edward Abson Marsland (18 May 1923 – February 1996) was a British academic who served as Vice-Chancellor of the University of Birmingham.

Marsland received his early education at King Edward's School, Birmingham. He graduated with a PhD from the Faculty of Medicine of Birmingham University in 1950. His thesis was 'A histological investigation of amelogenesis in rats, with special reference to maturation'.

Marsland was Professor of Oral Surgery at Birmingham University from 1979 to 1982, and Vice-Chancellor of the university from 1982 to 1987.

References

Alumni of the University of Birmingham
Academics of the University of Birmingham
Vice-Chancellors of the University of Birmingham
1923 births
1996 deaths